Sickology 101 is the eighth studio album, and the second in the "Collabos" series, by rapper Tech N9ne.

Early on, the album carried a "The Study of Being Sick" subtitle, but as its release grew nearer, the subtitle was phased out. The album features guest appearances from Krayzie Bone, Crooked I, Chino XL, Messy Marv, Ron Ron, Potluck, also featured are fellow Kansas City rappers Cash Image, D-Locc Da Chop and the 57th Street Rogue Dog . Furthermore, fellow Strange Music rappers Krizz Kaliko, Kutt Calhoun and Big Scoob are featured. It features production by producers that have previously collaborated with Tech, like Tramaine "Young Fyre" Winfrey, Jonah "Matic Lee" Appleby, Adam "Wyshmaster" Cherrington, and Michael "Seven" Summers, with additional production alongside Young Fyre, like Josh "Karbon" Brunstetter and Brian "Yung Fokus" Reid. The additional production credits were absent from the copies of the album in the initial pressing, but were added in subsequent pressings.

Both "Red Nose" and "Sickology 101" were released as digital singles on March 31, 2009, while "Nothin'" followed as a digital single on April 14, 2009. On March 24, 2009, the music video for "Red Nose" was added to YouTube by Strange Music's account in high-definition video. On April 13, 2009, the video premiered on MTVU.com. The video was directed by Dan Gedman.

The initial numbers released by Nielsen SoundScan for the albums' debut week were 18,680 which would have put the album at #23 on the Billboard 200. However, according to a news report by HipHopDX, Strange Music submitted proof, indicating the number to be 21,455 copies sold first week. As a result, Sickology 101 actually debuted on the Billboard 200 at No. 19.

On 17 June 2020, "Dysfunctional" featuring Krizz Kaliko and Big Scoob was certified gold by the RIAA.

Track listing

References

2009 albums
Tech N9ne albums
Albums produced by Seven (record producer)
Concept albums
Strange Music albums